Lima Province is located in the central coast of Peru and is the only province in the country not belonging to any of the twenty-five regions. Its capital is Lima, which is also the nation's capital.

Despite its small area, this province is the major industrial and economic powerhouse of the Peruvian economy. It concentrates almost one-third of the country's population and 50% of Peru's GDP in 2012.

History
The province was created in 1821 as Peru's territory was divided into departments, provinces, districts and parishes. The province was part of the Lima Department, which was formed by the territories of present-day Lima, Callao and Ica regions, and the provinces of Casma, Huarmey and Santa, which later would be part of the La Costa Department.

The department was further subdivided as time passed but the Lima Province kept being part of it. Due to the massive migration from other areas of the country, the need to separate the province from the rest of the department was forecast by experts.

In 2002, the new regionalization law passed by President Alejandro Toledo made the Lima Province a separate entity from the rest of the newly created Lima Region.

Political division

The province is divided into 43 Districts of Lima. Each of them is headed by a mayor, although the Metropolitan Municipality of Lima (Municipalidad Metropolitana de Lima), led by the mayor of Lima, also exercises its authority in these districts. These districts are grouped together into four sectors: Central Lima, North Lima, East Lima, and South Lima.

All the districts of Lima province are fused together in a continuous urban area, with the exception of the beach resort of Ancón and Santa Rosa in the north and Punta Hermosa, Punta Negra, San Bartolo, Santa Maria del Mar and Pucusana in the south.

Boundaries
 North: Huaral Province
 Northeast: Canta Province
 East: Huarochirí Province
 South: Cañete Province
 West: Callao Region and the Pacific Ocean

Government

Lima Province is administered by the Metropolitan Municipality of Lima (Municipalidad Metropolitana de Lima), which also administers the city of Lima. Its current mayor is Jorge Muñoz Wells (2019-2022).

Climate
From April to December, Lima is often covered in coastal fog and mist, while in January to late March, the weather is generally sunny.

Tourism
Lima has various tourist destinations and activities, including pre-Inca period pyramids, museums and modern shopping malls. There are many restaurants, some of which specialize in fresh seafood, bars and nightclubs. There are many beaches for sunbathing, swimming and fishing.

See also
 Wak'a Wallamarka

References

External links
  Municipalidad Metropolitana de Lima Metropolitan Lima Municipal Council official website

 
Lima